SANAA (Sejima and Nishizawa and Associates) is an architectural firm based in Tokyo, Japan. It was founded in 1995 by architects Kazuyo Sejima (1956–) and Ryue Nishizawa (1966–), who were awarded the Pritzker Prize in 2010. Notable works include the Toledo Museum of Art's Glass Pavilion in Toledo, Ohio; the New Museum of Contemporary Art in New York; the Rolex Learning Center at the EPFL in Lausanne; the Serpentine Pavilion in London; the Christian Dior Building in Omotesandō, Tokyo; the 21st Century Museum of Contemporary Art in Kanazawa; the Louvre-Lens Museum in France; and the Bocconi New Campus in Milan.

History
Kazuyo Sejima and Ryue Nishizawa founded SANAA in 1995. They later won the Golden Lion in 2004 for the most significant work in the Ninth International Architecture Exhibition of the Venice Biennale. In 2010, they were awarded the Pritzker Prize, which made Sejima the second woman to win this prize.

Projects
Australia
 The Museum of Contemporary Art (Not Built/Project Only) - 1997 to 1999 - Sydney, Australia
China
 House for the CIPEA (China International Practical Exhibition of Architecture) - 2004 to Present - Nanjing, China
England
 Serpentine Gallery Pavilion - 2009 - London, England
France
 Le Louvre-Lens - 2005 to 2012 - Lens, Pas-de-Calais, France
Germany
 The New Mercedes Benz Museum (Not Built/Project Only) - 2002 - Stuttgart, Germany
 Zollverein School of Design - 2003 to 2006 - Essen, Germany
Japan
 Multimedia Studio - 1995 to 1996 - Gifu, Japan
 N Museum - 1995 to 1997 - Wakayama, Japan
 O Museum - 1995 to 1999 - Nagano, Japan
 S House - 1995 to 1996 - Okayama, Japan
 M House - 1996 to 1997 - Tokyo, Japan
 K Office Building - 1996 to 1997 - Ibaraki, Japan
 Koga Park Café - 1997 to 1998 - Ibaraki, Japan
 Welfare Center - 1997 - Kanagawa, Japan
 21st Century Museum of Contemporary Art - 1999 to 2004 - Kanazawa, Ishikawa, Japan
 Dior Omotesando Store - 2001 to 2003 - Tokyo, Japan

 Issey Miyake Store by Naoki Takizawa - 2003 - Tokyo, Japan
 Naoshima Ferry Terminal - 2003 to 2006 - Kagawa, Japan
Netherlands
 De Kunstlinie Theater & Cultural Center - 1998 to 2006 - Almere, Netherlands
 Lumiere Park Café - 1999 to Present - Almere, Netherlands
Italy
 Proposal for Reclaiming Salerno's Inner City - 1999 to Present - Italy
 Prada Beauty Store - 2000 - Arezzo, Italy
 Installation for the Japan Pavilion at the Venice Biennale - 2000 - Venice, Italy
 Bocconi New Campus - 2019 - Milan, Italy
Spain
 Extension to the Instituto Valenciano de Arte Moderno - 2002 to Present - Valencia, Spain
Switzerland
 Extension to the Rietberg Museum (Not Built/Project Only) - 2002 - Zurich, Switzerland
 Novartis Office Building - 2003 to Present - Basel, Switzerland
 Rolex Learning Center at the École Polytechnique Fédérale de Lausanne - 2004 to 2010 - Lausanne, Switzerland
Taiwan
 Taichung Green Museumbrary - 2022 - Taichung, Taiwan
United States
 The New Campus Center of the Illinois Institute of Technology (Not Built/Project Only) - 1998 - Chicago, Illinois, USA

 Grace Farms - 2015 - New Canaan, Connecticut, USA
 The Glass Pavilion at the Toledo Museum of Art - 2001 to 2006 - Toledo, Ohio, USA
 The New Museum of Contemporary Art - 2003 to 2007 - New York City, USA

Awards
SANAA's work was included in the exhibition City of Girls in the Japanese Pavilion at the 2000 Venice Biennale and in the Garden Cafe at the 7th International Istanbul Biennale, Istanbul, Turkey. Their work has also been exhibited at Zumtobel Staff-Lichtforum, Vienna, Austria; Institut Valencia d'Art Modern, Valencia, Spain; Zeche Zollverein, Essen, Germany; Gallery MA, Tokyo, Japan; N-museum, Wakayama, Japan and New Museum of Contemporary Art, New York. SANAA has been awarded the Golden Lion for the most remarkable work in the exhibition Metamorph in the 9th International Architecture Exhibition, La Biennale di Venezia in 2004, the 46th Mainichi Shinbun Arts Award (Architecture Category) in 2005, and the Schock Prize in the visual arts, also in 2005. In 2010, Sejima and Nishizawa were awarded the Pritzker Prize, the highest of honours in architecture.

Notes

References
 Matthew Allen (2010). "Control Yourself! Lifestyle Curation in the Work of Sejima and Nishizawa". Architecture at the Edge of Everything Else. WORK Books / MIT Press. 
 Thomas Daniell (2008). After the Crash: Architecture in Post-Bubble Japan. Princeton Architectural Press. 
 Kristin Feireiss (Ed): The Zollverein School of Management and Design Essen, Germany. Prestel, München 2006, 
 Gallery MA (2003). Kazuyo Sejima + Ryue Nishizawa / SANAA Works 1995–2003. Toto Shuppan. 
 GA (2005). Sejima Kazuyo + Nishizawa Ryue Dokuhon. A.D.A. Edita. 
 GA (2005). GA ARCHITECT 18 Sejima Kazuyo + Nishizawa Ryue. A.D.A. Edita. 
Joseph Grima and Karen Wong (Eds) (2008) Shift: SANAA and the New Museum. Lars Müller Publishers. 
Yuko Hasegawa (2006). Kazuyo Sejima + Ryue Nishizawa: SANAA. Phaidon Press. 
 Agustin Perez Rubio (2007). SANAA Houses: Kazuyo Sejima + Ryue Nishizawa. Actar.

External links

 SANAA Official Website
SANAA: Works 1998-2008 New Museum of Contemporary Art, New York Video at VernissageTV.
Pritzker Prize goes to SANAA - NPR audio
Zollverein School of Management and Design 
SANAA: Architecture Travel Guide on www.checkonsite.com

Architecture firms of Japan
Pritzker Architecture Prize winners